Simon Stoddart, FSA is a British archaeologist, prehistorian, and academic. He is a Reader in Prehistory at the University of Cambridge, a Fellow of Magdalene College, Cambridge, and the acting Deputy Director of the McDonald Institute for Archaeological Research.

Stoddart was editor of journal Antiquity, 2001-2002. He is a Fellow of the Society of Antiquaries of London, and a member of the Institute of Field Archaeologists.

Selected publications

References

External links 
 BBC Radio 4, In Our Time The Bronze Age Collapse link, 2016. Simon Stoddart on the panel with John Bennet and Linda Hulin.

Fellows of the Society of Antiquaries of London
Academics of the University of Oxford
Living people
Fellows of Magdalene College, Cambridge
Year of birth missing (living people)